Bamendjou is a town and commune in the west of Cameroon that extends over approximately 260 square kilometres.

It adjoins Baham, Bahouan, Batié, Bansoa, Bayangam, Bameka, and Bandjoun.

Its traditional leader is the Fo'o (King) of Bamendjou.

See also
Communes of Cameroon

External links
 Site de la primature - Élections municipales 2002 
 Contrôle de gestion et performance des services publics communaux des villes camerounaises - Thèse de Donation Avele, Université Montesquieu Bordeaux IV 
 Charles Nanga, La réforme de l’administration territoriale au Cameroun à la lumière de la loi constitutionnelle n° 96/06 du 18 janvier 1996, Mémoire ENA. 

Populated places in West Region (Cameroon)
Communes of Cameroon